The Phoenix School for Girls is a non-profit secondary school for girls in rural Poshi Village, Gutang, Lianyuan, Hunan, China.  The school was established to address the shortage of educational options for rural girls, who are often denied education due to the cost of tuition.  The school is the product of collaborations between the local community and the American Friends Service Committee.

The first class graduated in June 2005.

During the summer, an alternative summer camp is held at the Phoenix School, called China Summer.  The classes are taught by volunteers from the United States, China, Japan, and South Korea.  Class topics range from English to astronomy to insect biology.

External links 
AFSC China Summer Workcamp

Schools in China
Girls' schools in China
Education in Hunan